The Ikom monoliths are a series of volcanic-stone monoliths from the area of Ikom, Cross River State, Nigeria. In the 1960s, Allison estimated that the monoliths may have been engraved between the sixteenth and twentieth century CE.

Description
Numbering about 300 in total, the monoliths are between 0.3 and 1.8 metres (1 and 6 feet) high, and are laid out in some 30 circles located around Alok in the Ikom area of Cross River State.  The monoliths are phallic in form and some feature stylized faces as well as decorative patterns and inscriptions. Although the carvings have not been deciphered, researchers and linguists believe that the inscriptions may represent a form of writing and visual communication.

Conservation risk

Exposure to extreme weather conditions have put these monoliths at risk of erosion and deterioration. The monoliths are also located in an area where the nearby people do not commonly see their worth as tourist attractions. They were  added to the World Monuments Fund's list of sites in danger in 2008. In 2020, Ikom monoliths were found by U.S Customs and Border Protection at Miami International Airport under fraudulent documents. The artifacts are being returned to Nigeria.

Museum collections
A medium-sized example of an Ikom monolith with human facial features can be found in the British Museum's collection.

References

External links

 Yahoo News
 Ikom monoliths to change status of Cross River

2nd millennium in Nigeria
2nd-millennium sculptures
Inscriptions in undeciphered writing systems
Monoliths
Tourist attractions in Cross River State
World Heritage Sites in Nigeria